Cristopher Joel Pavón Funes (born 18 April 1993 in El Progreso) is a Honduran weightlifter. He competed for Honduras in the 2012 Summer Olympics and in the 2016 Summer Olympics. In 2019 he tested positive for Stanozolol metabolites and dehydrochloromethyl-testosterone metabolites and is banned until 2023 by the International Weightlifting Federation.

References

1993 births
Living people
People from Yoro Department
Honduran male weightlifters
Weightlifters at the 2012 Summer Olympics
Weightlifters at the 2016 Summer Olympics
Olympic weightlifters of Honduras
Weightlifters at the 2010 Summer Youth Olympics
Weightlifters at the 2015 Pan American Games
Pan American Games competitors for Honduras
20th-century Honduran people
21st-century Honduran people